Jürgen Kalfelder (born 27 September 1940) is a German sprinter. He competed in the men's 400 metres at the 1964 Summer Olympics.

References

1940 births
Living people
Athletes (track and field) at the 1964 Summer Olympics
German male sprinters
Olympic athletes of the United Team of Germany
Place of birth missing (living people)